Ciarán O'Boyle (born 22 February 1984) is an Irish former rugby union player.

Career
O'Boyle joined the Munster academy ahead of the 2005–06 season, and progressed to a development contract with the province ahead of the 2006–07 season. In 2007, O'Boyle was part of the Garryowen team that defeated Cork Constitution 16–15 in the All-Ireland League Division 1 final. He made his senior debut for Munster in their 28–14 win against Edinburgh on 22 February 2009, with O'Boyle scoring the try that clinched a bonus-point for the province. He also scored a try for Munster during his second appearance for the province in their 20–9 win against Newport Gwent Dragons on 7 March 2009, however, he also sustained a torn hamstring during the game, ruling him out for two months. Despite this setback, O'Boyle was promoted to a full contract for the 2009–10 season, but he was released by Munster at the end of that season and returned to the amateur club scene with Garryowen.

References

External links
Munster Profile

1984 births
Living people
Rugby union players from Limerick (city)
Irish rugby union players
Munster Rugby players
Garryowen Football Club players
Rugby union wings